Labangan, officially the Municipality of Labangan (Subanen: Benwa Labangan; Chavacano: Municipalidad de Labangan), is a 3rd class municipality in the province of Zamboanga del Sur, Philippines. According to the 2020 census, it has a population of 44,262 people.

Geography

Barangays
Labangan is politically subdivided into 25 barangays.

Climate

Demographics

Economy

Tourism
 Pulacan Falls - 12 km. from Pagadian City, and covering an area of 400 square meters. It is the source of water for the Labangan irrigation system. Two kilometers from the area is the 134-hectare Home Defense Center. The falls can be reached easily by any motor vehicle. With the opening of the PADAP road, Pulacan Falls became a beautiful camping and picnic site. It now has a permanent Boy and Girl Scout site with facilities and has been the location of regional and provincial jamborees.
 Army Site - The new division site of 1st Infantry (TABAK) Division, Philippine Army, is located on the top of the Hill of Kuta Major Cesar L Sang-an.

References

External links
 Labangan Profile at PhilAtlas.com
 [ Philippine Standard Geographic Code]
 Philippine Census Information

Municipalities of Zamboanga del Sur